Kajiado County is a county in the former Rift Valley Province of Kenya. As of 2019, Kajiado county spanned an area of 21,292.7 km2, with a recorded population of 1,117,840. The county capital is Kajiado, but the largest town is Ongata Rongai. Its main tourist attraction is its wildlife.

Demographics 
Kajiado county has a total population of 1,117,840 people, of which 557,098 being male, 560,704 are females and 38 intersex people. There are 316,179 households with an average size of 3.5 person per household and a population density of 51 people per square kilometre.

Source

Administrative and political units 

Kajiado County is divided into 5 sub-counties and 25 Wards with Kajiado West being the largest 
and Kajiado North Sub-county being the smallest in terms of area in Km2

Administration units 
Kajiado is subdivided into five sub-counties with 25 county assembly wards across the county. All the five constituencies have 5 county assembly wards each. There are 17 divisions which is further subdivided into 101 locations and 212 sub-locations.

Source

Constituencies 
Kajiado Central Constituency
Kajiado North Constituency
Kajiado South Constituency
Kajiado East Constituency
Kajiado West Constituency

Political leadership 
Joseph Jama Ole Lenku is the governor serving his first term after being elected in 2017 on and is deputised by Martin Moshisho Martin. Phillip Salau Mpaayeiwas is serving his first term as the senator and was elected in 2017. Janet Marania Teyiaa is the second women representative for the county and was also elected in 2017 on a Jubilee Party ticket.

Education 

Kajiado has 811 ECD centres, 568 primary schools, 124 secondary schools, 18 tertiary institutions and 7 polytechnic.

Source

Health 
The doctor population ratio is 1:26,094, Public Health Staff is 1: 7,619, and the nurse population ratio is 1: 1,068.

Source

Transport and communication 
A total of 2,419.2 km of road network cover the county. of this 1,111.9 km ic covered by earth surface, 932.3 km is murram surface and 375 km is covered by bitumen.There are 11 Post Offices with 4,105 installed letter boxes, 3,220 rented letter boxes and 885 vacant letter boxes..

Trade and commerce 
There are one hundred trading centres in the county.

Tomato, Cabbage, Kales and Banana are mainly grown for horticulture production. Crops grown for cereal production include maize, sorghum millet, beans, cowpeas and greengrams. Some of the tubers grown are sweet potatoes, cassava, Irish potatoes.

The three main livestock kept are cattle, sheep, goats and they are kept for meat, offal, raw fats, fresh hides and skins.

Services
 Source: USAid Kenya

Nairobi Metro

Kajiado County is within Greater Nairobi metro. The counties are:
 Source: NairobiMetro/ Kenya Census

Stats

Population development

Urbanisation
 Source: OpenDataKenya

Wealth/Poverty Level
 Source: OpenDataKenya Worldbank

See also
Amboseli Reserve is in the Kajiado County
Nyiri Desert, a high proportion of the county lies in the desert
Kitengela, a plain and a town of the same name in Kajiado County

See also
Taita Taveta County
Machakos County
Makueni County
Kiambu County
Nakuru County
Narok County
Nairobi County

References

External links
https://web.archive.org/web/20060518005113/http://www.kajiado-district-dev-trust.org.uk/
https://web.archive.org/web/20070402092415/http://www.kajiadochildrenshome.com/

 
Counties of Kenya